David Prince Miller (1809–1873) was a British showman and magician who founded several Adelphi Theatres: in at least Glasgow, Coatbridge and Dumbarton.

Conceptual he created the idea of reduced Shakespeare plays, creating plays which lasted 20 minutes, an idea later followed by the Reduced Shakespeare Company.

Life

From around 1825 he appeared as an illusionist in small theatres and halls in England and southern Scotland.

He came to Glasgow in July 1839 from Dalkeith, setting up a show on Glasgow Green during the Glasgow Fair. Other acts at the same fair included John Henry Anderson. Although Miller only charged one penny for entrance, he netted £70 during the Fair (the equivalent of £7,500 in 2020) and was able to reinvest this money in his travelling show which he took to Stirling Cupar, Dundee, Perth. Kirkcaldy, St Andrews and Dunfermline. He over-wintered in Airdrie before starting the circle again in 1840.

In 1842 (using his profits from the travelling show) he built the Sans Pareil Theatre near the Saltmarket (holding 1200) in central Glasgow and the Adelphi Theatre on the edge of Glasgow Green (holding 2500). The Adelphi was one of only two large theatres at that time and was in rivalry with John Henry Anderson's Theatre Royal. Miller targeted the poorer residents of the city. In 1845 he is listed as "Manager of the Adelphi Theatre" living at 4 Steel Street, close to Glasgow Green. The theatre was timber-built and huge, even by modern standards, holding 2500 spectators. A false alarm in the theatre caused a panic in which an 18-year-old boy received fatal injuries.

In 1848 he sold the theatre to James Calvert of Dublin. It burnt down soon after.

Miller went on tour with a show called "Through Fire and Water". In 1855 Miller was on tour with a play concerning his own life: "The Ups and Downs of Life" which was performed at the Royal Clarence Theatre in London.

In 1863, in partnership with a Walter Edwin, he built an Adelphi Theatre in Coatbridge holding an audience of 1500. Roughly at the same time he also opened an Adelphi Theatre in Dumbarton.

In later life he ran the Prince's Mall Theatre. He was then living at 48 London Street in the centre.

He died on 24 May 1873. He is buried in the lower south section of Glasgow Necropolis.

The Adelphi Theatre in Coatbridge was renamed the Princess Theatre in 1873 having been sold to new owners.

Family

He was married with a namesake son, David Prince Miller and daughter, Elizabeth Miller.

Other Works

In 1853 he published a book of his struggles entitled "The Life of a Showman".

References

1809 births
1873 deaths
British magicians
Burials at the Glasgow Necropolis